Katowice Forest Park ) is a large park and wooded area in the southern part of the city of Katowice, Poland. It is the largest green area in Katowice.

Parks in Katowice